The Roman Catholic Diocese of Menongue is a diocese located in the city of Menongue in the Ecclesiastical province of Lubango in Angola.

History
 10 August 1975: Established as Diocese of Serpa Pinto from the Diocese of Nova Lisboa and Diocese of Sá da Bandeira
 16 May 1979: Renamed as Diocese of Menongue

Special churches
The Cathedral of the diocese is Sé Catedral de Nossa Senhora de Fátima (Cathedral Church of Our Lady of Fatima) in Menongue.

Bishops

Ordinaries, in reverse chronological order
 Bishops of Menongue (Roman rite), below
 Bishop Leopoldo Ndakalako (19 March 2019–present)
 Bishop Mário Lucunde (3 August 2005  – 12 March 2018)
 Bishop José de Queirós Alves, C.SS.R. (12 September 1986  – 3 May 2004), appointed Archbishop of Huambo
 Bishop Francisco Viti (16 May 1979  – 12 September 1986), appointed Archbishop of Huambo
 Bishop of Serpa Pinto (Roman rite), below
 Bishop Francisco Viti (10 August 1975  – 16 May 1979); see above

See also
Roman Catholicism in Angola

Sources
 GCatholic.org

References

Roman Catholic dioceses in Angola
Christian organizations established in 1975
Roman Catholic dioceses and prelatures established in the 20th century
Menongue, Roman Catholic Diocese of
1975 establishments in Angola